The Provostry of St. Michael is a monastery in Langquaid in the district of Kelheim in Bavaria, Germany.

History
The monastery, dedicated to Saint Michael, was founded in 1141 by Gebhard von Roning, as a monastery of Canons Regular, which it remained until 1598. It was re-founded in 1616 by monks from Andechs Abbey as a Benedictine community, which was dissolved during the secularization of monasteries in Bavaria in 1803.

The monastery was bought in 1974 by the Canons Regular of the newly refounded Congregation of Windesheim, and is the motherhouse of this revived congregation.

Buildings
The buildings had been bought by a farmer during the 19th century, and were partially destroyed.

External links
  Klöster in Bayern: Paring

Augustinian monasteries in Germany
Benedictine monasteries in Germany
Monasteries in Bavaria
1140s establishments in the Holy Roman Empire
1141 establishments in Europe
1803 disestablishments in the Holy Roman Empire
Religious organizations established in the 1140s
Religious organizations disestablished in 1803
Christian monasteries established in the 12th century
Christian monasteries established in the 17th century
Christian monasteries disestablished in the 19th century
20th-century Christian monasteries